Soviet imagery has been extensively used by Russian forces during the Russo-Ukrainian War, especially following the invasion of Ukraine by Russia on 24 February 2022.

History

Following the invasion, many Russian tanks were shown flying the old flag of the Soviet Union alongside the pro-war Z military symbol. American political scientist Mark Beissinger told France 24 that the purpose of using these symbols was not necessarily to do with communism, but rather a desire to re-establish "Russian domination over Ukraine", noting that the use of Soviet symbols in most post-Soviet states (with the exception of Russia and Belarus) is often seen as a provocative act.

The American historian Anne Applebaum told The Guardian that "Because modern Russia stands for nothing except corruption, nihilism, and Putin's personal power, they have brought back Soviet flags as well as Lenin statues to symbolise Russian victory". In many occupied towns and cities, including government buildings, Ukrainian flags have been replaced with Victory Banners. These banners, which signified Russia's defeat of Nazi Germany in 1945, have symbolic meaning, as Russian president Vladimir Putin has said that the purpose of the Russian invasion was to denazify Ukraine. Many statues of Vladimir Lenin had been removed following the Euromaidan protests of 2014, or under later decommunisation laws passed in 2015 as a result of Euromaidan. However, in Russian-occupied towns, many of these statues have been re-erected.

In addition to symbolism, the Bolshevism of the Russian forces manifests itself in their toponymic policy: the occupiers everywhere "return" their Soviet names to the captured settlements and cities (as well as to those they want to capture). This is officially motivated by the desire to restore historical justice. In fact, as a rule, anti-historical names given by the Bolsheviks in the 1920s and 1930s are restored instead of either returned historical (pre-revolutionary) names or Ukrainianized names obtained as part of the company for the decommunization of the country in 2014-22. Examples: Artemivsk instead of Bakhmut, Krasny (Red) Liman instead of Liman, Volodarske instead of Nikolske, Stakhanov instead of Kadiivka, etc.

Events

In April 2022, a video of a Ukrainian woman named Anna Ivanovna greeting Ukrainian soldiers at her home near Dvorichna, whom she thought to be Russian, with a Soviet flag went viral on pro-Russian social media, and featured on Russian state-controlled media. The woman said that she and her husband had "waited, prayed for them, for Putin and all the people". The Ukrainian soldiers gave her food, but went on to mock her and trample on her Soviet flag, after which she said "my parents died for that flag in the Great Patriotic War". This was used by Russian propagandists to prove that the Russian invasion had popular support, in spite of the fact that most Ukrainians – even in Russian-speaking regions – opposed the invasion. In Russia, murals, postcards, street art, billboards, chevrons and stickers depicting the woman have been created. In Russian-controlled Mariupol, a statue of her was unveiled. She has been nicknamed "Grandmother Z", and the "Grandmother with a red flag" by Russians. Sergey Kiriyenko, a senior Russian politician, referred to her as "Grandma Anya".

In May 2022, Anna Ivanovna told the Ukrayinska Pravda that she met the soldiers with a Soviet flag not out of sympathy, but because she felt the need to reconcile with them so that they would not "destroy" the village and Ukraine after her house was shelled, but now feels like a "traitor" due to the way her image has been used by Russia. The next month, the woman spoke to BBC News journalists to which she stated  that she did not support the war but claimed that she had (mistakenly) greeted two Russian soldiers and that, at the time, she was "just happy that Russians would come and not fight with us. I was happy that we would unite again." In August 2022, she told BBC News Russian that she still lived near Dvorichna and was "not going to leave anywhere." The promotion of the "Grandmother with a red flag" in Russian state-controlled media almost stopped after it was discovered that Anna Ivanovna did not oppose the Ukrainian authorities.

On 26 August 2022, the Soviet Victory banner was hoisted over the village Pisky, a fortified area just off Donetsk whose capture is strategic for Russia, in their attempt to push Ukrainian forces away from Donbas.

Additionally, many Lenin statues across Ukraine, which had been taken down by the Ukrainians in the preceding years, were re-erected by the Russians in the Russian-controlled areas.

See also 
 Z (military symbol)
 Soviet patriotism
 Russian nationalism
 Ribbon of Saint George
 Strength is in truth
 Nostalgia for the Soviet Union
 Anti-Maidan
 Anti-Maidan (Russia)
 List of communist monuments in Ukraine
 Demolition of monuments to Vladimir Lenin in Ukraine
 Outline of the Russo-Ukrainian War

References 

Events affected by the 2022 Russian invasion of Ukraine
Russo-Ukrainian War
Anti-Ukrainian sentiment in Russia
Anti-Ukrainian sentiment in Ukraine
Propaganda in Russia related to the 2022 Russian invasion of Ukraine
Russian nationalism
Neo-Sovietism
Nationalism in the Soviet Union
Nostalgia for the Soviet Union